Mesfin Tasew Bekele is an Ethiopian businessman, electrical and communications engineer, who serves as the group chief executive officer of the Ethiopian Airlines Group, since 24 March 2022.

Before that, between 2021 and March 2022, Mesfin T. Bekele was the CEO of Asky Airlines, a private Togolese airline, in which the Ethiopian Airlines Group is a strategic partner, maintains a 40 percent ownership and is the largest shareholder.

Background and education
Bekele is an Ethiopian national. He holds a Bachelor of Science degree in Electrical Engineering, obtained from Addis Ababa University. His second degree, a Master of Science in Communications Engineering was also awarded by Addis Ababa University. He also holds a Master of Business Administration degree, obtained from the Open University, in the United Kingdom.

Career
For the 11 years between 2010 and 2021, Bekele was the chief operations officer (COO) of the Ethiopian Airlines Group, based at the group headquarters in Addis Ababa, Ethiopia's capital city. Having joined the airline in 1984, he has served in various roles, including in airline engineering, maintenance and management. Other areas include "aircraft procurement, flight operations and strategic development".

As CEO of Ethiopian Airlines Group, he will lead over 17,000 employees, replacing Tewolde Gebremariam, the previous CEO, who retired on 23 March 2022, due to health reasons.

See also
 Girma Wake
 Tewolde Gebremariam

References

External links
 Official Website of Ethiopian Airlines

Living people
1960s births
Ethiopian chief executives
Ethiopian engineers
Ethiopian electrical engineers
Ethiopian businesspeople
Ethiopian business executives
Ethiopian Airlines
Addis Ababa University alumni
Alumni of the Open University